Epelebodina concolorata is a species of moth of the family Tortricidae. It is found in India (Jammu and Kashmir).

The wings are cream, densely sprinkled with cream brown especially in the apex area. The hindwings are paler than the forewing.

Etymology
The species name refers to the colouration of the species and is derived from Latin concolor (meaning of equal colour).

References

External links

Moths described in 2006
Moths of Asia
Polyorthini
Taxa named by Józef Razowski